= Billy Connolly Live 1994 =

- Starring: Billy Connolly
- Release date: 1994
- Country: United Kingdom
- Language: English

Billy Connolly Live 1994 is a live comedy video by Billy Connolly from one of 20 nights at the Hammersmith Apollo. It was the best-selling comedy VHS tape in the UK in 1994. Connolly's performances at the Apollo had been well received by critics.
